The 1978–79 season was Liverpool Football Club's 87th season in existence and their 17th consecutive season in the First Division. Liverpool won its 11th league title with a record-breaking season. They amassed a record points total of 68, with Kenny Dalglish and Graeme Souness as commanding influences in the team that had the highest goal scoring ratio under Bob Paisley's management. Defensively, Liverpool conceded only 16 goals (just four of them at Anfield) and goalkeeper Ray Clemence kept a total of 28 clean sheets in 42 League matches. Disappointing for Liverpool was the early exit of the European Cup, losing to domestic rivals Nottingham Forest in the inaugural round; Forest went on to win the European Cup along with the League Cup, and were proving to be Liverpool's most fierce competitors as the decade drew to a close. This ended Liverpool's chances of taking three European Cups in a row, an achievement only Real Madrid, Ajax and Bayern Munich have ever succeeded in doing.

Squad

Goalkeepers
  Ray Clemence
  Steve Ogrizovic

Defenders
  Emlyn Hughes
  Joey Jones
  Brian Kettle
  Colin Irwin
  Phil Neal
  Alan Hansen
  Phil Thompson
  Alan Kennedy

Midfielders
  Ian Callaghan
  Jimmy Case
  Steve Heighway
  Sammy Lee
  Ray Kennedy
  Terry McDermott
  Kevin Sheedy
  Graeme Souness

Attackers
  David Fairclough
  Kenny Dalglish
  Howard Gayle
  David Johnson

League table

Results

First Division

FA Cup

League Cup

European Cup

European Super Cup

References
  LFC History.net – Games for the 1978–79 season
Liverweb - Games for the 1978-79 season

Liverpool F.C. seasons
Liverpool
English football championship-winning seasons